A collision between two commuter trains in Chicago occurred during the cloudy morning rush hour on October 30, 1972, and was the worst such crash in Chicago's history. Illinois Central Gulf Train 416, made up of newly purchased Highliners, overshot the 27th Street station on what is now the Metra Electric Line, and the engineer asked and received permission from the train's conductor to back the train to the platform. This move was then made without the flag protection required by the railroad's rules. The train's crew had not used a flagman before, and while it was a prescribed practice, it had fallen out of use. Instead, the conductor and the engineer worked in concert to back up the train, with the curve in the track partially blocking the view.   

Train 416 passed the automatic block signals, which cleared express Train 720, made up of more heavily constructed single level cars, to continue at full speed on the same track. The engineer of the express train did not see the bilevel train backing up until it was too late. When the trains collided, the front car of the express train telescoped the rear car of the bilevel train, killing 45 people and injuring 332. The death toll could have been higher, but the accident occurred near Michael Reese Hospital (which later moved) and Mercy Hospital.

Later investigations showed that Train 720 likely could have seen the red light for Train 416 and avoided a collision if it was traveling slower (30 mph). It is estimated that Train 720 hit Train 416 at about 44-50 mph.

References

External links

 Collision of Illinois Central Gulf Railroad Commuter Trains: Investigation Summary and Recommendations 
 List of crash dead identified - Clipping from Chicago Tribune - Newspapers.com

Works cited

Railway accidents in 1972
Railway accidents and incidents in Illinois
History of Chicago
Accidents and incidents involving Illinois Central Railroad
1972 in Illinois
October 1972 events in the United States